Lithosia is a genus of moths in the family Erebidae. The genus was first described by Johan Christian Fabricius in 1798. Species are cosmopolitan.

Description
Palpi short and porrect (extending forward). Antennae ciliated. Forewing with shorter and broader cell. Vein 2 from beyond the middle. Vein 3 and 4 stalked, vein 5 absent, vein 6 from below angle or from angle or beyond it. Vein 9 rising from vein 10 and forming an areole or stalked with veins 7 and 8. Vein 11 free or anastomosing (fused) with vein 12. Hindwing with vein 3, 4 and 6, 7 stalked. Vein 5 absent and vein 8 from middle of cell.

Species
 Lithosia quadra Linnaeus, 1758
 Lithosia taishanica Daniel, 1954
 Lithosia yuennanensis (Daniel, 1952)

Placement unclear
 Lithosia amoyca Daniel, 1954
 Lithosia atuntseica Daniel, 1954
 Lithosia clarivenata Reich, 1937
 Lithosia eburneola Turati, 1933
 Lithosia gynaegrapha de Joannis, 1930
 Lithosia insolata Dannatt, 1929
 Lithosia likiangica Daniel, 1954
 Lithosia lungtanica Daniel, 1954
 Lithosia szetchuana Sterneck, 1938
 Lithosia tienmushanica Daniel, 1954

Former species
 Lithosia atroradiata Walker, 1864
 Lithosia chekiangica Daniel, 1954
 Lithosia chrysargyrea Kiriakoff, 1963
 Lithosia colonoides Kiriakoff, 1963
 Lithosia formosicola Matsumura, 1927
 Lithosia fukienica Daniel, 1954
 Lithosia horishanella Matsumura, 1927
 Lithosia hunanica Daniel, 1954
 Lithosia innshanica Daniel, 1939
 Lithosia karenkona Matsumura, 1930
 Lithosia magnata Matsumura, 1927
 Lithosia minima Daniel, 1954
 Lithosia pavescens Daniel, 1954
 Lithosia ranrunensis Matsumura, 1927
 Lithosia postmaculosa Matsumura, 1927
 Lithosia pseudocomplana Daniel, 1939
 Lithosia ratonella Matsumura, 1927
 Lithosia rhyparodactyla Kiriakoff, 1963
 Lithosia saitonis Matsumura, 1927
 Lithosia sakia Matsumura, 1927
 Lithosia subcosteola Druce, 1899
 Lithosia taiwanella Matsumura, 1927
 Lithosia tomponis Matsumura, 1927
 Lithosia uniformeola Daniel, 1954
 Lithosia usuguronis Matsumura, 1927

References

External links

Lithosiina
Moth genera
Taxa named by Johan Christian Fabricius